The 1976 UCI Road World Championships took place from 4-5 September 1976 in Ostuni, Italy. Only two races took place due to the Montreal Olympics.

Results

Medal table

External links 

 Men's results
 Women's results
  Results at sportpro.it

 
UCI Road World Championships by year
UCI Road World Championships 1976
UCI Road World Championships 1976
UCI Road World Championships
Uci Road World Championships, 1976
UCI Road World Championships